USS LST-959 was an  in the United States Navy. Like many of her class, she was not named and is properly referred to by her hull designation.

Construction
LST-959 was laid down on 6 October 1944, at Hingham, Massachusetts, by the Bethlehem-Hingham Shipyard; launched on 4 November 1944; and commissioned on 25 November 1944.

Service history
During World War II, LST-959 was assigned to the Asiatic-Pacific theater and participated in the assault and occupation of Okinawa Gunto in June 1945.

Following the war, she performed occupation duty in the Far East and saw service in China until mid-May 1946. She was decommissioned on 13 June 1946, and struck from the Navy list on 3 July, that same year. On 10 June 1948, the ship was stripped and destroyed at Subic Bay, Philippines.

Awards
LST-959 earned one battle star for World War II service.

Notes

Citations

Bibliography 

Online resources

External links
 

LST-542-class tank landing ships
World War II amphibious warfare vessels of the United States
Ships built in Hingham, Massachusetts
1944 ships